Coral Springs High School is a public high school located in Coral Springs, Florida, United States. It is a part of the Broward County Public Schools district.

Demographics
As of the 2021–22 school year, the total student enrollment was 2,495. The ethnic makeup of the school was 41.5% White, 50.1% Black, 28.4% Hispanic, 4.3% Asian, 0.4% Pacific Islander, 2.9% Multiracial, and 0.8% Native American or Native Alaskan.

Clubs and activities
Coral Springs High School offers 40-50 different club opportunities to choose from.

Notable alumni 

 Todd Barry, stand-up comedian
 Lewis Brinson, Major League Baseball (MLB) player
 Cody Brown, National Football League (NFL) player
 Greg Cipes, voice actor and musician
 Walter Dix, Olympic sprinter
 Steve Hutchinson, NFL football player 
 George LeMieux, United States Senator from Florida
 Steve Rosenberg, Major League Baseball player
 Jennifer Schwalbach Smith, actress
 Laine Selwyn, Women's National Basketball Association (WNBA) basketball player 
 Jennifer Taylor, actress
Ezenwa Ukeagu, professional basketball player
 Phil Varone, drummer
 Ski Mask the Slump God, American rapper, born 1996.

References

External links 
 Coral Springs High School

Educational institutions established in 1975
1975 establishments in Florida
High schools in Broward County, Florida
Public high schools in Florida
Buildings and structures in Coral Springs, Florida